Chakulia Assembly constituency is an assembly constituency in Uttar Dinajpur district in the Indian state of West Bengal.

Overview
As per orders of the Delimitation Commission, No. 31 Chakulia Assembly constituency covers Goalpokhar II community development block and Bazargaon I and Bazargaon II gram panchayats of  Karandighi community development block.

Chakulia Assembly constituency is part of No. 5. Raiganj (Lok Sabha constituency).

Members of Legislative Assembly

Election results

2021 Election

2016
In the 2016 election, Ali Imran Ramz (Victor) of AIFB defeated his nearest rival Ashim Kumar Mridha of BJP.

 

Note- Indian National Congress supported the All India Forward Bloc candidate Ali Imran Ramz (Victor) in 2016.

2011
In the 2011 election, Ali Imran Ramz of AIFB defeated his nearest rival Serajul Islam of Congress.

References

Assembly constituencies of West Bengal
Politics of Uttar Dinajpur district